Zelenka (feminine: Zelenková) is a Czech and Slovak surname. The name stems from the adjective "zelený" (green). Notable people with the surname include:

People

Zelenka
 Eric Zelenka, senior worldwide product marketing manager at Apple Inc.
 František Zelenka (1883–1944), Czech-Jewish functionalist architect
 Jan Dismas Zelenka (1679–1745), Czech baroque composer
 Jiří Zelenka (born 1972), Czech ice hockey player
 Joe Zelenka (born 1976), American National Football League player
 Karel Zelenka (born 1983), Italian figure skater
 Ladislav Zelenka, member of the Bohemian Quartet
 Luděk Zelenka (born 1973), Czech footballer
 Lukáš Zelenka (born 1979), Czech footballer
 Petr Zelenka (director) (born 1967), Czech film director
 Petr Zelenka (serial killer) (born 1976), Czech serial killer
 Sarah Zelenka (born 1987), American rower

Zelenkova
 Lucie Zelenková (born 1974), Czech triathlete
 Marie Zelenková, Czech table tennis player
 Olga Zelenkova (born 1967), Russian retired swimmer

Fictional characters
 Radek Zelenka, Czech character in the TV series Stargate Atlantis, portrayed by David Nykl

See also
 Selenka,  a surnamw
 
 

Czech-language surnames
Slovak-language surnames